Hypatopa hera is a moth in the family Blastobasidae. It is found in Costa Rica.

The length of the forewings is about 5.5 mm. The forewings are pale brown and the hindwings are translucent pale brown

Etymology
The specific name refers to the Greek goddess Hera.

References

Moths described in 2013
Hypatopa